Beverage Brands is a British alcoholic beverage company based in Gloucestershire.

History
It was founded in Torquay, and was based at Rockwood House on Parkhill Road.
Its managing director and founder was Joe Woods (born c.1955). He grew up in Torquay, having moved there from Greenock when aged 11.

In May 2011 it announced that it was leaving Torquay.

Products
Its main product is WKD Original Vodka, which is the market leading ready to drink (RTD) alcoholic beverage in Ireland and the UK.  WKD sells £258 million in the UK. In 2009 it produced a cider called WKD Core.

It produced Woody's from December 1995; from July 2001 it became Woody's Vodka Refresher, and sold until December 2003, then relaunched in September 2008.

Beverage Brands is the sixth largest manufacturer of RTDs in the world.

Structure
The company is based off junction 11a of the M5, off the B4641 in Hucclecote.

It was based in Torquay from 1992 until 2011; the main bottling plants is on the Cumnock Business Park in Netherthird, East Ayrshire at the A76/B7083 roundabout, with another at Shepton Mallet.

References

External links
 Beverage Brands

Drink companies of the United Kingdom
Companies based in Devon
Companies based in Gloucester
Food and drink companies established in 1992
East Ayrshire
Torbay
1992 establishments in England